Illusion is a superyacht built in 2013 at the Dutch Heesen Yachts shipyard.  The interior design of Illusion was done by Bannenberg & Rowell Design and the exterior work was done by Omega Architects.
It was launched as the Galactica Star with an original sale price of €65 million.

The yacht was seized in 2017 as part of the US government Kleptocracy Asset Recovery Initiative from former Nigerian Minister of Petroleum Resources, Diezani Alison-Madueke. It was then sold at auction in 2019 to Burgess yachts representing an unknown buyer. It was then renamed to the Illusion. 

The yacht is owned by shell company Paxford Ltd. and is operated by Burgess yachts, a yacht service provider, where it is available for charter.

Design 
Both the materials of the hull and the superstructure are made out of aluminum with teak laid decks. The yacht is Lloyd's registered, issued by Cayman Islands. The 65m Heesen superyacht Illusion (Project Omnia YN 16465) is a Fast Displacement Hull Form (FDHF) superyacht concept vessel, with aluminum hull and superstructure designed by Van Oossanen and Heesen Yachts Naval Architects. Illusion'''s exterior is designed by Omega Architects.

 Yacht specifications 
The vessel has six cabins to accommodate 12 passengers in 6 cabins.
Builder/ designer: Heesen Yachts, Heesen, Omega, Omega Architects, Van Oossanen & Associates

 Engines 

 See also 
 Motor yacht List of motor yachts by length List of yachts built by Heesen''

References 

2013 ships
Motor yachts
Ships built in the Netherlands